Tati language may refer to:
 Tat language (Caucasus), a language from the eastern Caucasus
 Judeo-Tat, dialect of the Mountain Jews, also called Tati
 Tati language (Iran), a language from Iran
 Tsoa language (also called Hietshware language), a Khoe language

See also
Tat language (disambiguation)